Mohammad Iqbal Qasim (born 6 August 1953) is a former Pakistani cricketer who played in 50 Test matches and 15 One Day Internationals between 1976 and 1988.

Qasim ended his career with 171 wickets in his 50 Test matches, at approximately 3.5 wickets a match. His accurate bowling saw his economy rate at a low 2.21. He pushed the ball through quicker than normal, not extracting great turn, but deceiving batsmen through variations in pace and trajectory.

He is most notable for spinning Pakistan to victory in the 5th Test at Bangalore of the 1987 India-Pakistan series, and thus securing Pakistan's first series win on Indian soil. He took 9/121, including the key scalp of Sunil Gavaskar for 96 in the last innings of the game.

Iqbal Qasim remained in the shadows of his teammate, leg spinner Abdul Qadir, although his career returns are superior by average and very similar by strike rate.

He became Pakistan's chief selector in 2012.

References

External links
 

1953 births
Living people
Pakistan One Day International cricketers
Pakistan Test cricketers
Pakistani cricketers
Cricketers from Karachi
Karachi Whites cricketers
National Bank of Pakistan cricketers
Karachi cricketers
Sindh cricketers
Cheshire cricketers
Pakistani cricket administrators